Amphorina pallida is a species of sea slug or nudibranch, a marine gastropod mollusc in the family Eubranchidae. Several species of Eubranchus were transferred to Amphorina in 2020.

Distribution
This species was described from Cullercoats, England. It has been reported from Eastport, Maine; Iceland, the Barents Sea and the Atlantic coast of Europe from Norway south to the Mediterranean Sea.

References

Eubranchidae
Gastropods described in 1842